The Coastal corridor is a high-speed rail corridor running along the eastern coast of China, stretching from Dalian in the north to Fangchenggang in the south and passing through the cities of Shenyang, Qinhuangdao, Tianjin, Dongying, Weifang, Qingdao, Lianyungang, Yancheng, Nantong, Shanghai, Ningbo. Fuzhou, Xiamen, Shenzhen, and Zhanjiang. The Weifang–Qingdao stretch splits into two, one directly connecting Weifang to Qingdao, the other connecting Weifang to Qingdao through Yantai. Announced in 2016 as part of the national "eight vertical and eight horizontal" high-speed railway network as an expanded Hangzhou–Fuzhou–Shenzhen passenger railway from the "four vertical and four horizontal" plan. The line will comprise a mixture of high-speed railway lines, upgraded conventional rail lines and intercity railways.

Route

parallel old sections

branch sections

See also 
 High-speed rail in China
 Hangzhou–Fuzhou–Shenzhen passenger-dedicated railway

References 

High-speed rail in China